Richard Kent Tomlinson (born August 5, 1928) is a former American football guard who played for the Pittsburgh Steelers. He played college football at the University of Kansas after attending Dodge City High School in Dodge City, Kansas.

References

Living people
1928 births
American football offensive guards
Kansas Jayhawks football players
Pittsburgh Steelers players
Players of American football from Chicago